In Israel, the Neeman Committee was established to solve disputes concerning the process of Conversion to Judaism within the borders of Israel, which by the Law of Return also grants automatic citizenship and accompanying rights. It is unrelated to the ongoing debate about which conversions performed outside Israel should be recognized.

External links
 The full text of the recommendations, in Hebrew

Jewish organizations based in Israel
Jewish outreach
Israeli immigration law
Legal organizations based in Israel
Conversion to Judaism